Loginovskaya is a rural locality (a village) in Moshinskoye Rural Settlement of Nyandomsky District, Arkhangelsk Oblast, Russia. The population was 183 as of 2010.

Geography 
Loginovskaya is located on the Moshinskoye Lake, 44 km northeast of Nyandoma (the district's administrative centre) by road. Korekhino is the nearest rural locality.

References 

Rural localities in Nyandomsky District